The 1979 Australian Rallycross Championship was a CAMS sanctioned Australian motor racing title which was contested on 24 June 1979 at Tailem Bend Raceway near Tailem Bend in South Australia. It was the inaugural Australian Rallycross Championship, and is, as of 2014, the only such title to have been recognised by the Confederation of Australian Motor Sport.

The championship was won by Larry Perkins driving a Volkswagen Beetle for Kruger Motors.

Championship classification 

Following a number of qualifying heats, six drivers contested the championship final.

References

Rallycross Championship
Rallycross
Motorsport in South Australia